Macau Anglican College (MAC;) is a Christian school in Taipa, Macau. Macau Anglican College was established in the year 2002, and provides education from Kindergarten to Senior Secondary. It is an Anglican Foundation College, meaning it receives professional advice and financial backing from the Anglican Church in Hong Kong. The college employs a large number of Christian teachers from many Christian denominations. It works closely with the Education and Youth Affairs Bureau (DSEJ) and students' parents who are represented by a Parent – School Association.

History 

Macau Anglican College opened in 2002 as a private school with 145 pupils spanning 5 classes in total. It was founded by former principal David Brown along with other senior staff. The kindergarten and secondary sections are privately run and require parents to pay a fee (secondary students who are also Macau citizens are also totally subsidised by the government), while the primary section is government-subsidized and free for Macau residents. Initially, the school only offered kindergarten and primary programs; in 2009, they began offering a secondary education curriculum. The first secondary graduation took place in 2014. The school offers students help with Cambridge (CIE) IGCSE and A-Level examinations.

Curriculum 
Priority for placement in the secondary education program is given to the previous years' graduating MAC pupils. Secondary pupils may take the Cambridge (CIE) IGCSE Examinations in Form 4 and CIE A-Level Examinations in Form 6.

Pupils learn two main languages – English and Chinese - and two optional – French and Portuguese. The average class size in the school is 26 pupils in primary. Class numbers fluctuate in secondary.

Lower secondary students must take compulsory subjects including ICT, Chinese, English, Science, and more. Upper secondary students have more freedom of choice in choosing which subjects they wish to study before; Chinese, English, Mathematics and Physical Education are compulsory due to local government requirements.

School activities 
School activities include class assemblies, theatrical productions during events such as Christmas and the Chinese New Year, charity work, field trips, graduation trips and barbecues, themed dress-up days and school parties during festivals/holidays. For secondary students, there is a chapel period every other Wednesday. Pupils were also offered a variety of extra-curricular activities, and after-school care is provided for children in case it is necessitated by their parents' schedules. Due to new requirements from the local government, after school (or "co-curricular") activities are compulsory for secondary students also.

School facilities 
The school is situated on the island of Taipa, down the road from the IFT. The campus features two large playgrounds, one on the ground floor and one on the roof. The roof playground is also intended for sports activities. Facilities on-campus include two libraries, computer suites, two music rooms, art rooms and science labs. Kindergarten classrooms feature outdoor segments which are used as play and activity areas for the children.

The school was designed by the architect Jose F. Pereira Chan. He says that it was the mission of the school that inspired him to look at "the creation of Adam", the fresco painted by Michelangelo at the Sistine Chapel's ceiling. The hand detail in the drawing reflects the concept of God communicating himself to humanity, hence the finger was adopted as the design concept for the school.

References

External links 

 Macau Anglican College

Schools in Macau
2002 establishments in Macau
Educational institutions established in 2002